Reynaldo Galido (born 1 May 1975) is a Filipino boxer. He competed in the men's light welterweight event at the 1996 Summer Olympics.

References

1975 births
Living people
Filipino male boxers
Olympic boxers of the Philippines
Boxers at the 1996 Summer Olympics
Place of birth missing (living people)
Asian Games medalists in boxing
Boxers at the 1994 Asian Games
Boxers at the 1998 Asian Games
Medalists at the 1994 Asian Games
Asian Games gold medalists for the Philippines
Light-welterweight boxers
20th-century Filipino people